The Israeli Bangkok embassy hostage crisis occurred on 28 December 1972. It was a raid by a squad of four Palestinian militants, belonging to the Black September organization, on the Israeli embassy building in Bangkok in which the militants held six Israeli embassy staff hostage. After 19 hours of negotiations, the hijackers agreed to abandon the embassy in exchange for being flown to Egypt. The raid was one of a number of attacks against that have been conducted against Israeli embassies and diplomats.

Attack
The attack began when two Black September operatives infiltrated a party being held at the embassy. Once these two were inside, two others climbed over the wall with automatic weapons and together the four took over the embassy. They allowed all the Thais to leave but kept six Israelis hostage, including Shimon Avimor, Israeli Ambassador to Cambodia who was visiting. Rehavam Amir, the Israeli ambassador, and his wife Avital were attending the investiture ceremony of Vajiralongkorn as Crown Prince of Thailand at the Ananta Samakhom Throne Hall, thus they were not among the hostages and could therefore participate in the negotiations with the militants. Ambassador Amir and Prime Minister Thanom Kittikachorn was informed about the siege during a break in the middle of the ceremony.

The militants moved their hostages to the second floor of the three storey building and made their demands. The militants demanded that 36 prisoners be released from Israeli prisons, including Kōzō Okamoto and the survivors of the Sabena Flight 571 incident. They threatened to blow up the embassy if these demands were not met by 08:00 on 29 December.

Two Thai government members, Dawee Chullasapya and Chatichai Choonhavan, who was then deputy foreign minister and became prime minister in 1988, along with the Egyptian ambassador to Thailand, Mustapha el Assawy, negotiated the release of the hostages and instead offered themselves and a number of other Thai officials as surety for the terrorists' safe conduct to Cairo.

After 19 hours of negotiation, an agreement, subsequently dubbed the "Bangkok solution", was worked out and no-one was injured.

Feeling that the Thai nation's celebration of the investiture of the heir to the throne should not be marred by a dispute that did not concern them, the Thai government guaranteed the terrorists safe travel to Cairo while leaving the hostages in the care of the Thais.

The Black September leadership was reportedly upset with the behavior of its operatives in settling the incident.

Then-Israeli prime minister Golda Meir praised the Thai government for their diplomacy which made for a bloodless end of the crisis.

See also
 Israel–Thailand relations

References

External links
Incident summary on START database
Arab Gunmen Free 6 Held In Bangkok St. Petersburg Times, 29 December 1972
Arab Terrorists Flown To Cairo After Releasing Six Hostages The Daily Telegraph, 30 December 1972
Bangkok Terrorists Given Heroes Welcome In Cairo Palm Beach Post, 30 December 1972

1972 crimes in Thailand
1972 in international relations
1970s in Bangkok
Attacks on buildings and structures in 1972
Attacks on diplomatic missions in Thailand
Bangkok
Black September Organization
December 1972 crimes
December 1972 events in Asia
Hostage taking in Thailand
Bangkok Embassy hostage crisis
Terrorist attacks attributed to Palestinian militant groups
Terrorist incidents in Asia in 1972
Terrorist incidents in Bangkok
Terrorist incidents in Thailand in the 1970s